Nenset Church is a parish church of the Church of Norway in Skien Municipality in Vestfold og Telemark county, Norway. It is located in the Nenset/Tollnes area in the western part of the town of Skien. It is one of the churches for the Gimsøy og Nenset parish which is part of the Skien prosti (deanery) in the Diocese of Agder og Telemark. The white, brick church was built in a long church design in 1961 using plans drawn up by the architects Gudolf Blakstad and Herman Munthe-Kaas. The church seats about 400 people.

History
After World War II, there was a desire for an annex chapel and cemetery in the Nenset/Tollnes area, just west of the town of Skien in (what was then) Solum municipality. After some fundraising, this was approved. Gudolf Blakstad and Herman Munthe-Kaas were hired to design the new building. The building had a chapel on the 2nd floor with space for approximately 200 people, while there was a parish hall and kitchen on the 1st floor. The building was consecrated on 17 December 1961. This was intended to be a two-stage construction project with a larger church to be built later. In 1988, the Nenset Chapel was upgraded to parish church status and re-titled as Nenset Church. In 1996, the second building phase was carried out by architect Tor Arild Danielsen. A new church room was completed and parish offices were added into the older part of the building. The newly-enlarged building was re-consecrated on 19 January 1997.

See also
List of churches in Agder og Telemark

References

Buildings and structures in Skien
Churches in Vestfold og Telemark
Long churches in Norway
Brick churches in Norway
20th-century Church of Norway church buildings
Churches completed in 1961
1961 establishments in Norway